Sergey Vyacheslavovich Bezdenezhnykh (born 25 August 1979) is a Russian politician and Senator from Khabarovsk Krai.

Biography

Early life and career
Sergey Bezdenezhnykh was born on 25 August 1979 in Amursk (Khabarovsk Krai). His father was an electrician and his mother was a kindergarten teacher.

In 1994 Bezdenezhnykh joined Liberal Democratic Party of Russia. He later was an aide to State Duma member Sergey Semyonov in 1998–2000 (Semyonov lost re-election in 1999). Simultaneously, Sergey Bezdenezhnykh was a member of Political Consultative Council under Governor Viktor Ishayev in 1998–1999. Bezdenezhnykh later was a member of Council of Political Parties under Khabarovsk Mayor Aleksandr Sokolov.

Sergey Bezdenezhnykh graduated Khabarovsk State Industrial Economic College in 2005 with a diploma in legal. In 2005–2006 Bezdenezhnykh worked as a jurist in timber trading company LLP "Alkuma", which was owned by Khabarovsk LDPR leader Sergey Furgal. Since 2006 Sergey Bezdenezhnykh was general director of Alkuma. In 2007 Bezdenezhnykh was chairman of the board of directors of retailer "KM".

In 2005–2014 Sergey Bezdenezhnykh served as and aide to Khabarovsk Krai Legislative Duma members Nikolay Mistryukov (business partner of Sergey Furgal and Vyacheslav Furgal (elder brother of Sergey Furgal). Bezdenezhnykh also was a member of Khabarovsk's Industrial District Territorial Electoral Commission in 2008–2014.

In 2009 Bezdenezhnykh graduated Pacific State University with a diploma in legal.

Sergey Bezdenezhnykh ran for Khabarovsk City Duma in 2009. He placed third (among three candidates) in Constituency №16 with 23.95% of the vote, losing to incumbent Izabella Proshina (CPRF, 42.33%).

In 2010 Bezdenezhnykh ran for Khabarovsk Krai Legislative Duma as No.3 in LPDR party list's Industrial territorial group and in Promyshlenny constituency №5. In the constituency Bezdenezhnykh placed fourth with 12.85% of the vote.

In 2011 Sergey Bezdenezhnykh ran for the Head of Korfovsky. He won 23.73% of the vote and placed third among three candidates.

Legislative Duma of Khabarovsk Krai
Sergey Bezdenezhnykh again ran for Khabarovsk Krai Legislative Duma in 2014 as No.1 in LDPR party list's Khabarovsk territorial group. LDPR received 13.34% of the vote and was given 3 mandates which went to party leader Vladimir Zhirinovsky, Sergey Furgal's aide Yelena Greshnyakova and incumbent deputy Vyacheslav Furgal. However, Zhirinovsky gave up his mandate which was awarded to Sergey Bezdenezhnykh.

In Legislative Duma Sergey Bezdenezhnykh was a member of Committee on Budget, Taxes and Economic Development and Committee on Industry, Entrepreneurship and Infrastructure.

In 2015 Bezdenezhnykh left his position as general director of LLP "Alkuma" and registered as individual entrepreneur.

Sergey Bezdenezhnykh in 2018 ran in an open-seat contest for the Mayor of Khabarovsk as incumbent Mayor Aleksandr Sokolov declined to seek a fifth term. Bezdenezhnykh won 20.86% and placed third after Vice Mayor Sergey Kravchuk (United Russia, 39.97%) and Maksim Kukushkin (CPRF, 23.85%). Sergey Bezdenezhnykh notably underperformed in the election compared to Sergey Furgal who in the concurrent gubernatorial election defeated Vyacheslav Shport in the city of Khabarovsk.

In January–September 2019 Bezdenezhnykh held the position of deputy general director for legal affairs at LLP "Neomaks-Biznes". He was also a member of Coordinating Council of the Ministry of Justice Administration for Khabarovsk Krai and Jewish Autonomous Oblast.

Sergey Bezdenezhnykh ran for re-election to the Legislative Duma in 2019 in the newly-created suburban Topolevsky constituency №4 in Khabarovsky District. Bezdenezhnykh won the election with 46.74% of the vote, defeating Chairman of the Khabarovsky District Assembly of Deputies Dmitry Savchenko (United Russia, 21.56%) and three other candidates.

As LDPR took control of the Legislative Duma, Bezdenezhnykh was placed into the Duma leadership and chaired the Committee on Governmental Structure and Local Government. He also became deputy chair of the Liberal Democratic Party caucus.

Federation Council
Initially, Legislative Duma of Khabarovsk Krai chose Dmitry Priyatnov (LDPR) as its next Representative in the Federation Council, who would replace longtime Senator Viktor Ozerov. Priyatnov was confirmed on 23 October 2019. However, soon after an information appeared that Priyatnov had an expired criminal record for forgery which was not registered by the Electoral Commission. Amid the controversy, Dmitry Priyatnov resigned from the Federation Council on 31 October citing "personal reasons". Priyatnov later resigned from the Legislative Duma.

In late November 2019 LDPR caucus in Legislative Duma nominated Sergey Bezdenezhnykh to be a Member of the Federation Council, his only opponent was Maksim Kukushkin, nominated by CPRF. On 4 December Bezdenezhnykh was elected as Senator from Khabarovsk Krai with 24 votes, including Vice Speaker from United Russia Gennady Maltsev.

In the Federation Council Sergey Bezdenezhnykh joined the Committee on Defense and Security. 

Governor Sergey Furgal was arrested on 9 July 2020 on charges of assassination attempt of his business competitors on 2004–2005. The arrest sparked mass protests in Khabarovsk and other Russian cities. Furgal was replaced by Mikhail Degtyarev as Governor of Khabarovsk Krai on 20 July. Senator Bezdenezhnykh publicly named Degtyarev a "temporary figure" and confirmed LDPR's support of Sergey Furgal. 

In February 2021 acting Governor Degtyarev was elected coordinator of the LDPR Khabarovsk regional office. A new coordinating council of the regional office was elected but both senators Sergey Bezdenezhnykh and Yelena Greshnyakova were not nominated and lost their position in party's leadership.

In May 2021 Sergey Bezdenezhnykh left Liberal Democratic Party of Russia due to Degtyarev's ban on support of arrested Governor Furgal. LDPR urged Senator Bezdenezhnykh to resign but he declined. Earlier in April fellow Senator Yelena Greshnyakova left the party which also sparked Zhirinovsky's son Igor Lebedev offensive comments towards Greshnyakova urging her to resign.

Sergey Bezdenezhnykh was viewed as a high-profile candidate in upcoming gubernatorial election. Bezdenezhnykh ultimately declined to run and endorsed Yelena Greshnyakova who also considered to mount a "Pro-Furgal" challenge to acting Governor Mikhail Degtyarev. Senator Greshnyakova also later declined and ran for State Duma instead.

In September 2021 Khabarovsk Krai Legislative Duma Speaker Irina Zikunova retrieved Bezdenezhnykh's cabinet in Duma which was viewed as a punishment for Bezdenezhnykh feud with Krai leadership.

On 15 December 2021 Bezdenezhnykh was among 4 senators to vote against the bill "On common principles of public authority in subjects of the Russian Federation".

On 29 March 2022 Senator Bezdenezhnykh joined A Just Russia — For Truth political party, alongside 10 municipal deputies in Khabarovsk Krai, who previously left LDPR citing party's resistance to their support for former Governor Sergey Furgal.

Personal life
Sergey Bezdenezhnykh is married and has a daughter.

His hobbies include alpine skiing and diving.

Until September 2019 Bezdenezhnykh was a founder of Khabarovsk regional charity organisation "Civic Vector". In 2016–2019 Bezdenezhnykh held a 33.3% shares of LLP "Gosavtoshkola" (State Driving School).

References 

Living people
1979 births
Members of the Federation Council of Russia (after 2000)
21st-century Russian politicians
People from Khabarovsk Krai